Zieria hindii, commonly known as the Hind's zieria, is a plant in the citrus family Rutaceae and is endemic to a small area in north-eastern New South Wales. It is an erect, slender shrub with warty branches, three-part, clover-like leaves, and clusters of small white flowers with four petals and four stamens. It is only known from the Nightcap Range.

Description
Its branches are glabrous but covered with warty lumps. The upper surface of the leaflets is dark green and glabrous but dotted with oil glands while the lower surface is a paler green and covered with star-like hairs. The flowers are arranged in clusters of seven to thirteen (sometimes as many as 35) in leaf axils, the clusters shorter than the leaves. There are four stamens. Flowering occurs in spring and summer and is followed by fruit which are glabrous, warty capsules.

Taxonomy and naming
Zieria hindii was first formally described in 2002 by James Armstrong from a specimen collected in the Whian Whian State Forest in the Nightcap Range. The description was published in Australian Systematic Botany.

Distribution and habitat
Hind's zieria is only known from the Nightcap Range where it grows on rocky hillsides.

References

External links
 

hindii
Sapindales of Australia
Flora of New South Wales
Plants described in 2002